The Ruth and Bruce Rappaport Faculty of Medicine is a medical school that operates in Bat Galim, Haifa and is part of the Technion's Faculty of Medicine.

The faculty was established in the late 1960s by a group of physicians who found the need for an academic school specialized in medical education and research.

The medical school merged with the Technion – Israel Institute of Technology in 1973.

History

In the late 1960s a need for a medical school and research center in Northern Israel was increasing. The medical school was established in 1969 to fill in the need. On January 3, 1971, the Technion Senate approved the merger of the Medical School with the Technion. On October 1, 1973, the school became a full faculty of the school. The academic backing and funding of the Technion progressed the expansive of the school into a full 6-year medical school.

Notable achievements
The faculty is the home of two Nobel Laureates: Prof. Avram Hershko and Prof. Aaron Ciechanover.

See also
 Technion – Israel Institute of Technology

References

External links 
 Faculty Website

Technion – Israel Institute of Technology
Medical schools in Israel